The president of Bolivia is the head of state and head of government of Bolivia, directly elected to a five-year term by the Bolivian people. The officeholder leads the executive branch of the government and is the captain general of the Armed Forces of Bolivia.

Since the office was established in 1825, 65 men and 2 women have served as president. The first president, Simón Bolívar, was elected by the General Assembly of Deputies of the Province of Upper Peru. For purposes of numbering, members of jointly-ruling juntas and other governing bodies are not included in the official count of presidents, unless one member later assumed the presidency in their own right. Three presidents: Antonio José de Sucre, Germán Busch, and Hernán Siles Zuazo became, after a brief, non-consecutive, interim exercise of power, presidents for longer terms later. In these cases, they are numbered according to that second term. Therefore, Busch is counted as the 36th president, not the 35th, Siles Zuazo as the 46th instead of the 45th, etc.

The presidency of Pedro Blanco Soto, who was assassinated six days after taking office in 1828, was the shortest in Bolivian history. Evo Morales served the longest, over thirteen years, before resigning in 2019. He is the only president to have served more than two consecutive terms. José Miguel de Velasco and Víctor Paz Estenssoro each served for four terms. However, all of Velasco's were non-consecutive and two were in an acting capacity while Paz Estenssoro only served twice consecutively in 1960 and 1964.

Three presidents died in office, one of natural causes and two through tragic circumstances (Adolfo Ballivián, Germán Busch, and René Barrientos). Three were assassinated (Pedro Blanco Soto, Agustín Morales, and Gualberto Villarroel). The latter resigned mere hours before his death. Additionally, Manuel Antonio Sánchez and Pedro José de Guerra died of natural causes while exercising provisional presidential functions while eight former presidents were assassinated after leaving office (Antonio José de Sucre, Eusebio Guilarte, Manuel Isidoro Belzu, Jorge Córdova, Mariano Melgarejo, Hilarión Daza, José Manuel Pando, and Juan José Torres).

Five vice presidents assumed the presidency during a presidential term (José Luis Tejada Sorzano, Mamerto Urriolagoitía, Luis Adolfo Siles Salinas, Jorge Quiroga, and Carlos Mesa). Tejada Sorzano was the first to do so in 1934 while Quiroga was the only one to complete the term of their predecessor (Tejada Sorzano extended his mandate past the term of his predecessor).

22 presidents were deposed in 23 coups d'état (1839, 1841; twice, 1848; twice, 1857, 1861, 1864, 1871, 1876, 1879, 1920, 1936, 1937, 1943, 1964, 1969, 1970, 1971, 1978; twice, 1979, and 1980). Velasco was deposed twice in 1841 and December 1848. Additionally, the Council of Ministers of Hernando Siles Reyes was deposed in 1930. Three presidents were deposed by a civil war, a popular uprising, and a revolution. Transmissions of command from one de facto government to another de facto government occurred in seven cases (1841, 1946, 1965, 1966, 1981; twice, and 1982). Two special cases occurred in 1939 when Carlos Quintanilla was installed by the military after the death of Germán Busch and in 1951 when President Mamerto Urriolagoitía resigned in a self-coup in favor of a military junta. Two unconstitutional successions occurred in 1930 when Hernando Siles Reyes entrusted command to his council of ministers and 1934 when Daniel Salamanca was ousted in favor of his vice president, José Luis Tejada Sorzano. Finally, some supporters of Evo Morales claim that he was ousted by a coup d'état and that the presidency of Jeanine Áñez was an unconstitutional succession of power. However, this is disputed.

There are seven living former presidents. The most recent to die was Luis García Meza, on 29 April 2018.

Presidents

Timeline

See also

References

Notes

Footnotes

Bibliography

External links 

 Ministry of the Presidency 

Bolivia, List of presidents of
List
Presidents of Bolivia, List of